Moline station is a proposed train station in Moline, Illinois, for the Quad Cities train. Construction has begun and the station was initially expected that rail service would begin by 2019.

In July 2019, a new transportation bill was passed by the Illinois state legislature, supported by Governor J.B. Pritzker, $225M was appropriated to begin this service.

History
Until 1979, the Rock Island Railroad's Quad Cities Rocket, served the Quad Cities. However, due to poor on-time performance and deteriorating track conditions, ridership declined substantially, causing the state of Illinois to pull the subsidy keeping the train running, leaving the Quad Cities without passenger rail service.

In 2008, efforts to restore passenger rail service to the Quad Cities were set in motion. In 2010, the City of Moline got a federal TIGER grant for construction of the station. However, in early 2015, Governor Bruce Rauner put all major spending projects under review, including the Chicago-Quad Cities Amtrak line, on hold. Despite this, construction on the station started in 2015, and continued throughout the period the line's future was in question. By June 2016, under threat of losing the federal funding for the line, the state released the matching funds needed to move the project forward. On February 24, 2017, it was announced that the station will be complete in August, with passenger rail service to commence soon thereafter. , no service had yet been scheduled. In its 2020–2025 service plan, Amtrak forecasts that the Chicago–Moline route will begin in fiscal year 2024 and attract 165,600 riders that year.

References

Future Amtrak stations in the United States
Passenger rail transportation in Illinois
Buildings and structures in Moline, Illinois
Transportation in Rock Island County, Illinois